Marije Joling (born 30 September 1987) is a Dutch allround speed skater.

In 2013, Joling won the 5000 m event at the Dutch Single Distance Championships. At the 2015 World Single Distance Speed Skating Championships in Heerenveen she won the bronze medal at the 3000 m event behind Martina Sáblíková and Ireen Wüst. At the same championships she won the silver medal with the Dutch team in the team pursuit event, finishing 0.02s behind the Japanese team.

Personal bests

References

External links
 Marije Joling's official website
 SpeedSkatingNews profile

1987 births
Dutch female speed skaters
Living people
People from Assen
World Single Distances Speed Skating Championships medalists
21st-century Dutch women
Sportspeople from Drenthe